Beyond Zork (full title: Beyond Zork: The Coconut of Quendor) is an interactive fiction computer game written by Brian Moriarty and released by Infocom in 1987. It was one of the last games in the Zork series developed by Infocom (titles such as Zork Nemesis and Zork: Grand Inquisitor were created after Activision had dissolved Infocom as a company and kept the Infocom brand name). It signified a notable departure from the standard format of Infocom's earlier games which relied purely on text and puzzle-solving: among other features, Beyond Zork incorporated a crude on-screen map, the use of character statistics and levels, and RPG combat elements.

The game, Infocom's twenty-ninth, was available on the Amiga (512KB), Apple (128KB), Atari ST, Commodore 128, IBM (192KB), and the Macintosh (512KB) computers.

Plot
The player explores the Southlands of Quendor somewhat aimlessly at first. Soon, however, a task is bestowed by the Implementors, a group of godlike creatures jokingly based on Infocom's game designers. The Coconut of Quendor, a mighty artifact that embodies the whole of Magic, has fallen into the claws of an unspeakably foul beast: an Ur-grue. Rumoured to be the spirits of fallen Implementors, Ur-Grues can surround themselves in a sphere of darkness that only sunlight can pierce. The player must recover the Coconut from this monster's grasp or face the unthinkable consequences.

Ur-grue

Beyond Zork introduces the "Ur-grue", a being which game materials describe as the progenitor and ruler of the monstrous race of grues—the term "Ur-grue" combines the German prefix ur- signifying "original" and "grue"—as well as the source of many other evil monsters. He is said to have originated as the shade of a "fallen Implementor".

The Ur-Grue character in Beyond Zork may be a reference to Brian Moriarty himself, the creator of the game, who is notably absent from the game's portrayal of an "Implementors' Luncheon", where each Implementor is recognizably based on a member of the Infocom staff. His persona as the progenitor of grues and creator of monsters may be linked to his role as the creator of the games' challenges, Infocom having long made joking references to grues being the foremost example of the Implementors' capricious, sometimes nonsensical design decisions.

The Ur-grue is revealed to be the primary villain of the story. The player, sent to retrieve the Coconut of Quendor from the Implementors, arrives at the Implementors' Luncheon on the Ethereal Plane of Atrii only to find he has been followed by the Ur-grue in shadow form, who takes the opportunity to steal it for himself. The player must then venture into the Ur-grue's extensive underground lair and retrieve it.

The Ur-grue is shown to be a dungeon master of sorts, controlling huge parts of the Zork underground and having accumulated an enormous hoard of treasure, of which the Coconut is his crowning acquisition. He has not only an army of grues at his disposal but also bizarre creatures of evil such as Lucksuckers, spirits who attack the player by draining his good fortune (reducing his Luck stat). The Ur-grue himself is surrounded by a pool of magical darkness that is capable of overcoming and destroying all artificial light sources, and is therefore only vulnerable to pure sunlight—the player, therefore, can only best him by using a series of mirrors to transmit a beam of light at him from outside the dungeon.

After doing so, the Ur-grue's shadowy form is dissipated revealing what may be his true form, that of a broken, withered old man. It is implied that the Ur-grue cannot survive long in this form and must possess others' bodies, like a demon, in order to survive—he attempts to possess the player. If he succeeds, a negative ending is revealed where the possessed player-character finds and strangles baby grues until he finds one strong enough to hold the Ur-grue's essence, implying that the Ur-grue's usual shadowy form is an enhanced version of a grue's body.

If the player's Compassion stat is high enough—represented by having done enough good deeds throughout the game—the Ur-grue is shown to be unable to possess the player, his evil apparently unable to coexist in the same body with an extremely pure or virtuous spirit, and the Ur-grue's old man form fades away. Whether this means the Ur-grue was permanently destroyed in this encounter is unclear, as is the possibility of others of his kind existing somewhere in the world, although, being magical in nature, it seems unlikely any Ur-grues could survive in Quendor following the Great Change.

Feelies
Almost since the company's beginning, Infocom's games included "extras" (called feelies) in the packages, often serving a dual purpose of entertainment and copy protection. Beyond Zork is no exception. The game package contained:
A large fold-out map of the "Southland of Quendor"
A small book titled The Lore and Legends of Quendor, a field guide of sorts to the flora and fauna of the area (several entries contained the information necessary to defeat or incapacitate creatures in the game)

Notes

Beyond Zork combined procedural generation and character creation with a very plot-heavy story, as the player's scores affected not just numerical gameplay mechanics, but crucial puzzles as well.  The game's mechanics combine the engine of a broader puzzle-based adventure game with areas featuring the mechanics of a simplified role-playing game or Multi-User Dungeon, particularly in the implementations of character statistics and levels. The "attributes" that affected the character were endurance, strength, dexterity, intelligence, compassion, and luck. These attributes could be manually allocated by the player at the beginning of the game or randomly set by the computer. Additionally, there were several preset characters that could be used. The values of these attributes affected combat and other aspects of the game.  Combat sections of the game were dependent on the player's strength, dexterity, and endurance (and slightly on luck);  meanwhile, puzzles often depended not just on solving a creative puzzle but on a required value in any one of the six statistics as well.

The game's design encouraged multiple playthroughs. The map was presented nonlinearly, and some paths and interactions required a high statistic to successfully complete the task. Every statistic could unlock at least one, and usually several, crucial puzzles and solutions;  but the player would find him or herself at a disadvantage in others. For example, an intelligent player character could read the words on magical scrolls, and use magical items, from early on in the game - this allowed the wide-ranging traversal of the map and the completion of many plot points, but the value required generally meant taking points away from the combat statistics. A dexterous character could traverse paths and enter rooms unavailable to the clumsy. Some enemies did not damage the character's hit points but instead their other statistics, and "dying" due to a non-hit-point statistic score falling to zero resulted in quite interesting death sequences. All values could be improved to the required solution values by gaining experience levels, eating or drinking certain foods or magical items, or wearing or using certain objects. Every playthrough of the game was different, due to procedural generation of maze-like dungeon areas, and many items that could actually unlock puzzles were semi-randomly placed.  Puzzles for which the easiest solution was disallowed by a low statistic required either raising that statistic through items and exploration, or alternate solutions not dependent on player scores, with some of these solutions quite obscure and/or requiring wide-ranging map traversal. (Humorously, repeated typing of profanities would lower the player's intelligence.)

Many locations, creatures and events encountered in other Zork games were referenced in Beyond Zork via its fictional setting in Quendor, the legendarium of the other Zork games.  As with all Zork games, the player must find and carry a light source in any darkened area of the map or be "eaten by a grue" within several turns of wandering around in the dark.

A short section of the game involves the magical land of Froon, "the setting for a series of beloved children's books by L. Frank Fzort, and later became a successful movie musical starring Judy Garlic." This is a not-very-subtle tribute to (or parody of) L. Frank Baum's The Wonderful Wizard of Oz.

Beyond Zork was one of 20 Infocom games bundled in the 1991 compilation The Lost Treasures of Infocom published by Activision.

Technical details

The game's most noticeable enhancement relative to its Infocom predecessors is the addition of an onscreen map to the heads-up display, which shows the player's location in relation to the surrounding area. In addition, game navigation can be accomplished via mouse clicks on the map, if the operating system that the game is running on supports mouse input.

In addition, the game continued the Zork series' early use of procedural generation in videogaming.  A number of magic items have initial locations and descriptions that are randomly determined, and some sections of the area map are randomly reorganized, each time a new game is played.  Role-playing game-like elements are also present in combat, including the concept of hit points and character statistics. Infocom had used these concepts before only in a rather limited way in Zork I and III.

Like Infocom's other games, Beyond Zork is platform independent and runs on a virtual computer architecture called the Z-machine. There were 4 versions of the game released in 1987, all using version 5 of the Z-machine. The game has 144 rooms and 77 objects, with a vocabulary of 1569 words and a total of 32778 opcodes.

Reception
A review in Computer Gaming World was pleased with some of Beyond Zork'''s features, particularly the ability to define macros and bind them to the function keys. The randomness of the game was described as frustrating, particularly as maps and item properties randomize upon restoring a previous game save. The review concluded by describing Beyond Zork as "a curious hybrid... mostly tough Infocom adventure with a patina of role-playing elements." In 1993 the magazine stated that the game's "merging of CRPG with adventure does not mix as well as it should". The game was reviewed in 1988 in Dragon #132 by Hartley, Patricia, and Kirk Lesser in "The Role of Computers" column. The reviewers gave the game 5 stars. Compute! stated that the game's combination of text adventure and RPG "introduces the next stage in interactive fiction". It concluded, "Beyond Zork reaffirms Infocom's position as king of the text adventures". Antic'' stated that "this hack-and-slash approach is not what we have come to expect from Infocom". While approving of Undo and other user interface improvements, the magazine disliked the loss of "exactly what Infocom writers do best—lots of descriptive text with a loving eye for detail that adds a sense of realism to good adventures". The reviewer concluded, "if adding these bells and whistles cuts into the heart of your product, is the trade-off worth it?"

References

External links
 
 
 Beyond Zork overview and information (archived)
 Scans of the Beyond Zork package, documentation and feelies
 Partial transcripts of Beyond Zork
 The Infocom Bugs List entry on Beyond Zork
 

1980s interactive fiction
1987 video games
Adventure games
Amiga games
Apple II games
Apple IIGS games
Atari ST games
Classic Mac OS games
Commodore 128 games
DOS games
Fantasy video games
Games commercially released with DOSBox
Video games developed in the United States
Video games featuring protagonists of selectable gender
Zork